Bhabhar railway station is a railway station in Banaskantha district, Gujarat, India on the Western line of the Western Railway network.

Nearby stations

Devgam is nearest railway station towards , whereas Mitha is nearest railway station towards .

Major trains

Following Express and Superfast trains halt at Bhabhar railway station in both direction:

 22483/84 Gandhidham–Jodhpur Express
 19151/52 Palanpur–Bhuj Intercity Express

References 

Railway stations in Banaskantha district
Ahmedabad railway division